Hankar may refer to:

 Paul Hankar (1859–1901), Belgian architect and designer 
 Hankar metro station, Brussels
 Hankaar or Hankār, one of the five evils described in Sikh philosophy
 Hankar (Mosul), the birthplace of Sufi saint Abu Saeed Mubarak Makhzoomi